Jacob Glen LaRavia (born November 3, 2001) is an American professional basketball player for the Memphis Grizzlies of the National Basketball Association (NBA). He played college basketball for the Indiana State Sycamores and the Wake Forest Demon Deacons.

After leading his high school team, Lawrence Central, to its first sectional title since 2012, LaRavia played two seasons of college basketball at Indiana State. With the Sycamores, he was named to the MVC All-Freshman and All-Newcomer teams as a freshman and was named to the Second-team All-MVC in his sophomore season. For his junior season, LaRavia transferred to Wake Forest and was named to the Second-team All-ACC. He was drafted 19th overall in the 2022 NBA draft by the Minnesota Timberwolves before later being traded to the Grizzlies.

Early life and high school career
LaRavia is the son of Jeff and Becky LaRavia. His family moved from Pasadena, California to Indianapolis when LaRavia was five years old. LaRavia played basketball for Lawrence Central High School in Indianapolis, where he was teammates with Nijel Pack and Dre Davis. He had a limited role until his senior season, in which he became the team's leading scorer. As a senior, LaRavia averaged 17.3 points, 6.8 rebounds, 3.9 assists and 2.3 steals per game, earning Indiana All-Star honors. He helped Lawrence Central win its first sectional title since 2012. LaRavia first committed to playing college basketball for SIU Edwardsville but reopened his recruitment after a coaching change. He later committed to Indiana State.

College career
As a freshman at Indiana State, LaRavia averaged 9.4 points and 5.9 rebounds per game. He was named to the All-Newcomer and All-Freshman Teams in the Missouri Valley Conference (MVC). In his sophomore season, LaRavia averaged 12.3 points and 6.3 rebounds per game, earning second-team All-MVC recognition. Following the departure of coach Greg Lansing, he transferred to Wake Forest. On January 22, 2022, LaRavia recorded a career-high 31 points, 10 rebounds and four assists in a 98–76 win against North Carolina. He averaged 14.6 points, 6.6 rebounds and 3.7 assists per game as a junior. He was named to the second-team All-Atlantic Coast Conference. On March 29, 2022, LaRavia declared for the 2022 NBA draft while maintaining his college eligibility. On June 1, 2022, he announced that he would remain in the draft and forgo his remaining college eligibility.

Professional career

Memphis Grizzlies (2022–present)
LaRavia was selected by the Minnesota Timberwolves with the 19th overall pick in the 2022 NBA draft. His draft rights were later traded to the Memphis Grizzlies, along with a future second-round pick, in exchange for the 22nd and 29th picks in the draft, which would later become Walker Kessler and TyTy Washington. LaRavia joined the Grizzlies' 2022 NBA Summer League roster. In his Summer League debut, he scored thirteen points in a 103–99 win over the Philadelphia 76ers. On October 19, 2022, LaRavia made his NBA debut, recording five points and two rebounds in a 115–112 overtime win over the New York Knicks.

Career statistics

College 

|-
| style="text-align:left;"| 2019–20
| style="text-align:left;"| Indiana State
| 30 || 25 || 24.6 || .529 || .407 || .625 || 5.9 || 1.6 || .5 || 1.2 || 9.4
|-
| style="text-align:left;"| 2020–21
| style="text-align:left;"| Indiana State
| 25 || 25 || 29.2 || .473 || .313 || .779 || 6.3 || 2.3 || 1.5 || .8 || 12.3
|-
| style="text-align:left;"| 2021–22
| style="text-align:left;"| Wake Forest
| 33 || 33 || 34.2 || .559 || .384 || .777 || 6.6 || 3.7 || 1.7 || 1.0 || 14.6
|- class="sortbottom"
| style="text-align:center;" colspan="2"| Career
| 88 || 83 || 29.5 || .524 || .371 || .743 || 6.3 || 2.6 || 1.2 || 1.0 || 12.2

References

External links

Wake Forest Demon Deacons bio
Indiana State Sycamores bio

2001 births
Living people
American men's basketball players
Basketball players from Indianapolis
Indiana State Sycamores men's basketball players
Memphis Grizzlies players
Minnesota Timberwolves draft picks
Power forwards (basketball)
Small forwards
Wake Forest Demon Deacons men's basketball players